William Burges (1827–1881) was an English architect, born in London.  He trained under Edward Blore and Matthew Digby Wyatt.  His works include churches, a cathedral, a warehouse, a university, a school, houses and castles.  Burges's most notable works are Cardiff Castle, constructed between 1866 and 1928, and Castell Coch (1872–91), both of which were built for John Crichton-Stuart, 3rd Marquess of Bute.

For most of the century following his death, Victorian architecture was neither the subject of intensive study nor sympathetic attention and Burges's work was largely ignored.  However the revival of interest in Victorian art, architecture, and design in the later twentieth century has led to a renewed appreciation of Burges and his work.

The list includes all known buildings by Burges, and significant alterations or additions made by him to existing structures.  Unexecuted designs are not listed.

Key

Works

Notes

References

 
 
 

Gothic Revival architecture
Burges